Simone Wilson may refer to:

Simone Wilson (politician), Australian politician
Monie Love (born Simone Johnson, 1970), English rapper